Japanese Peruvians ( or nipo-peruano; , Nikkei Perūjin) are Peruvian citizens of Japanese origin or ancestry.

Peru has the second largest ethnic Japanese population in South America after Brazil. This community has made a significant cultural impact on the country, today constituting approximately 0.1% of the population of Peru. In the 2017 Census in Peru, only 22,534 people self reported Nikkei or Japanese ancestry.

Peru was the first Latin American country to establish diplomatic relations with Japan, in June 1873. Peru was also the first Latin American country to accept Japanese immigration. The Sakura Maru carried Japanese families from Yokohama to Peru and arrived on April 3, 1899, at the Peruvian port city of Callao. This group of 790 Japanese became the first of several waves of emigrants who made new lives for themselves in Peru, some nine years before emigration to Brazil began.

Most immigrants arrived from Okinawa, Gifu, Hiroshima, Kanagawa and Osaka prefectures. Many arrived as farmers or to work in the fields but, after their contracts were completed, settled in the cities. In the period before World War II, the Japanese community in Peru was largely run by issei immigrants born in Japan. "Those of the second generation [the nisei] were almost inevitably excluded from community decision-making."

Japanese schools in Peru
Peru's current Japanese international school is Asociación Academia de Cultura Japonesa in Surco, Lima.

World War II

Although there had been ongoing tensions between non-Japanese and Japanese Peruvians, the situation was drastically exacerbated by the Second World War. Rising tensions ultimately led to a series of discriminatory laws being passed in 1936, the results of which included stigmatization of Japanese immigrants as "bestial," "untrustworthy," "militaristic," and "unfairly" competing with Peruvians for wages.

Fueled by legislative discrimination and media campaigns, a massive race riot (referred to as the "Saqueo") began on May 13, 1940, and lasted for three days. During the riots Japanese Peruvians were attacked and their homes and businesses destroyed. Despite its massive scale, the saqueo was underreported, a reflection of public sentiment towards the Japanese population at the time.

By 1941, there were around 26,000 immigrants of Japanese nationality in Peru. In December of that year, the Japanese Attack on Pearl Harbor, would mark the beginning of the Pacific war campaign for the United States of America in World War II. 
After the Japanese air raids on Pearl Harbor and the Philippines, the U.S. Office of Strategic Services (OSS), formed during World War II to coordinate secret espionage activities against the Axis Powers for the branches of the United States Armed Forces and the United States State Department, were alarmed at the large Japanese Peruvian community living in Peru and were also wary of the increasing new arrivals of Japanese nationals to Peru.

Fearing the Empire of Japan could sooner or later decide to invade the Republic of Peru and use the Southern American country as a landing base for its troops and its nationals living there as foreign agents against the US, in order to open another military front in the American Pacific, the U.S. government quickly negotiated with Lima a political-military alliance agreement in 1942.  This political-military alliance provided Peru with new military technology such as military aircraft, tanks, modern infantry equipment, and new boats for the Peruvian Navy, as well as new American bank loans and new investments in the Peruvian economy.

In return, the Americans ordered the Peruvians to track, identify and create ID files for all the Japanese Peruvians living in Peru. Later, at the end of 1942 and during all of 1943 and 1944, the Peruvian government on behalf of the U.S. Government and the OSS organized and started the massive arrests, without warrants and without judicial proceedings or hearings and the deportation of many of the Japanese Peruvian community to several American internment camps run by the U.S. Justice Department in the states of Nevada, New Mexico, Texas, Georgia and Virginia.

Racism and economic self-interest were major motivating factors in Peru's eager compliance with American deportation requests. As noted in a 1943 memorandum, Raymond Ickes of the Central and South American division of the Alien Enemy Control Unit had observed that many ethnic Japanese had been sent to the United States "... merely because the Peruvians wanted their businesses and not because there was any adverse evidence against them."

The enormous groups of Japanese Peruvian forced exiles were initially placed among the Japanese-Americans who had been excluded from the US west coast; later they were interned in the Immigration and Naturalization Service (INS) facilities in Crystal City, Texas; Kenedy, Texas; and Santa Fe, New Mexico. The Japanese-Peruvians were kept in these "alien detention camps" for more than two years before, through the efforts of civil rights attorney Wayne M. Collins, being offered "parole" relocation to the labor-starved farming community in Seabrook, New Jersey. The interned Japanese Peruvian nisei in the United States were further separated from the issei, in part because of distance between the internment camps and in part because the interned nisei knew almost nothing about their parents' homeland and language.

The deportation of Japanese Peruvians to the United States also involved expropriation without compensation of their property and other assets in Peru. At war's end, only 79 Japanese Peruvian citizens returned to Peru, and about 400 remained in the United States as "stateless" refugees. The interned Peruvian nisei who became naturalized American citizens would consider their children sansei, meaning three generations from the grandparents who had left Japan for Peru.

Post-war Japanese-Peruvians

Alberto Fujimori

Alberto Fujimori was born in Peru to Japanese parents and was the president of Peru from 1990 to 2000.

Dekasegi Japanese-Peruvians

In 1998, with new strict laws from the Japanese immigration, many fake-nikkei were deported or went back to Peru. The requirements to bring Japanese descendants were more strict, including documents as "zairyūshikaku-ninteishōmeisho"  or Certificate of Eligibility for Resident, which probes the Japanese bloodline of the applicant.

With the onset of the global recession in 2008, among the expatriate communities in Japan, Peruvians accounted for the smallest share of those who returned to their homelands. People returning from Japan also made up the smallest share of those applying for assistance under the new law. As of the end of November 2013, only three Peruvians who had returned from Japan had received reintegration assistance. The law provides some attractive benefits, but most Peruvians (as of 2015, there were 60,000 Peruvians in Japan) were not interested in returning to Peru.

Peruvians in Japan came together to offer support for Japanese victims of the devastating March 2011 earthquake and tsunami. In the wake of the disaster, the town of Minamisanriku in Miyagi Prefecture lost all but two of its fishing vessels. Peruvians raised money to buy the town new boats as a service to Japan and to express their gratitude for the hospitality received in Japan.

The Japanese press in Peru
In June 1921, Nippi Shimpo (Japanese-Peruvian News) was published.

Traditions and customs

After the ravages of World War II, the Peruvian Nikkei community continued with its activities, mainly through the practice of traditions inherited from their ancestors. Thus, festivities such as the celebration of the New Year (Shinnenkai), Girls' Day (Hinamatsuri), Children's Day (Kodomo no Hi), Matsuri, Buddhist festivals such as the Obon and Ohigan, among others, continue preserved in the Nikkei community.

The Nikkei in Peru have also known how to preserve precisely some of the customs and traditions brought by their parents and grandparents, and that they are part of their natural heritage. At the same time, Peruvians of Japanese descent, previously seen as a "closed" community, are today citizens who perform in all fields. Currently, the Japanese-Peruvians are one of the largest Nikkei communities in the world and the second largest in Latin America. Japanese-Peruvians mainly inhabit the central Peruvian coast (Lima and Trujillo has the most of them) and in some villages in the Amazon area.

Cuisine
The cuisine of Peru is a heterogeneous mixture of the diverse cultural influences that enriched the South American country. Nikkei cuisine, which fuses Peruvian and Japanese cuisine, has become a gastronomic sensation in many countries.

The origins of Nikkei cuisine relied on the wide variety of fresh ingredients in Peru, the prosperous fishing industry of Peru, the Japanese know-how using fresh seafood, and adopting ceviche, which is the Peruvian flag dish, and Chifa dishes as well (fusion cuisine that came from the Chinese community in Peru). Japanese fusion dishes like Acevichado maki sushi rolls were created by incorporating the recipes and flavors from the indigenous Peruvians. Some examples of chefs who use Nikkei cuisine include Nobu Matsuhisa, Ferran Adrià and Kurt Zdesar.

Notable people

 Anthony Aoki
 Alberto Fujimori: Former President of Peru
 Koichi Aparicio: Peruvian footballer
 Ernesto Arakaki: International footballer
 Hideyoshi Arakaki: Peruvian footballer
 Keiko Fujimori: Former First Lady, Congresswoman and businesswoman (daughter of Alberto Fujimori)
 Kenji Fujimori: Congressman (son of Alberto Fujimori)
 Santiago Fujimori: Lawyer (younger brother of Alberto Fujimori)
 Víctor García Toma: Former Minister of Justice
 Susana Higuchi: Politician, former First Lady, ex-spouse of Alberto Fujimori
 Jorge Hirano: International footballer
 Fernando Iwasaki: Writer
 Aldo Miyashiro: Writer, TV host and celebrity
 Augusto Miyashiro: Mayor of the City of Chorrillos since 1999, an important middle class southern suburban district of Metropolitan Lima 
 Kaoru Morioka: Japanese futsal player
 Venancio Shinki: Artist
 David Soria Yoshinari: International footballer
 José Pereda Maruyama: Retired international footballer, having notably played for Argentinian powerhouse Boca Juniors
 Akio Tamashiro: Karate athlete. Pan American Gold medalist. Head of the Peruvian Karate Federation
 Eduardo Tokeshi: Plastic artist
 Tilsa Tsuchiya: Artist
 José Watanabe: Poet
 Arturo Yamasaki: Football referee, famous for officiating the Match of the Century in the 1970 FIFA World Cup
 Rafael Yamashiro: Peruvian Congressman and politician
 Cesar Ychikawa: Singer and economist
 Jaime Yoshiyama: Former Prime Minister, former Cabinet Minister, former Vice President and former President of the Peruvian Congress
 Carlos Yushimito (Yoshimitsu): Writer and analyst

See also

Asian Latin Americans
Chinese Peruvians
Japan–Peru relations
Hirohito Ōta

Notes

References

Other cited works
Connell, Thomas. (2002). America's Japanese Hostages: The US Plan For A Japanese Free Hemisphere. Westport: Praeger-Greenwood. ; OCLC 606835431
Gardiner, Clinton Harvey. (1975). The Japanese and Peru. 1873-1973. Albuquerque: University of New Mexico Press. ; OCLC 2047887
Gardiner, C. Harvey. (1981). Pawns in a Triangle of Hate: The Peruvian Japanese and the United States. Seattle: University of Washington Press. ; OCLC 164799077
Higashide, Seiichi. (2000). Adios to Tears: The Memoirs of a Japanese-Peruvian Internee in U.S. Concentration Camps. Seattle: University of Washington Press.  ; OCLC 247923540
López-Calvo, Ignacio. (2009). One World Periphery Reads the Other. Knowing the 'Oriental' in the Americas and the Iberian Peninsula. Newcastle: Cambridge Scholars Publishing, 2009. 130–47.  ; OCLC 473479607
Masterson, Daniel M. and Sayaka Funada-Classen. (2004), The Japanese in Latin America: The Asian American Experience. (View at Google Books) Urbana, Illinois: University of Illinois Press. ;

External links
Association website

Asian Peruvian
Japanese Latin American
Ethnic groups in Peru
Peru